William James Butler (18 March 1858 – 10 December 1932) was a New Zealand sawmiller and timber merchant. He was born in Leamington, Warwickshire, England in 1858. He died in Wellington in 1932 and was survived by his wife. He was a brother of Joseph Butler.

References

1858 births
1932 deaths
English emigrants to New Zealand
New Zealand sawmillers